Hambletville is a hamlet in Delaware County, New York, United States. It is located northeast of Deposit at the intersection of NY Route 8 and China Road. The East Branch Cold Spring Creek converges with Cold Spring Creek west of the hamlet.

References

Geography of Delaware County, New York
Hamlets in Delaware County, New York
Hamlets in New York (state)